Bideshk (also Romanized as Bīdeshk and Bīde Shak) is a village in Kiskan Rural District, in the Central District of Baft County, Kerman Province, Iran. At the 2006 census, its population was 27, in 13 families.

References 

Populated places in Baft County